Chardin is a French surname. Notable people with the surname include:

 Jean-Baptiste-Siméon Chardin, (1699–1779), French painter noted for his still life works
 Jean Chardin, (1643–1713), French jeweller and traveller, author of The Travels of Sir John Chardin
 Louis-Armand Chardin (1755–1793), baritone and composer

Chardin is a component of the surname Teilhard de Chardin:

 Pierre Teilhard de Chardin, (1881–1955), French Jesuit, philosopher and paleontologist

See also
 Chardin Piccolet III, fictional character in the manga series Ranma ½

French-language surnames